Benjamin Ashby Clopton Jr.  (July 27, 1906 – November 19, 1987) was an artist best known for his work on Walt Disney and Harman-Ising animated cartoons.

Clopton was the fourth child of Benjamin Ashby and Hannah Olivia (Eklund) Clopton. His parents married in 1897 in the Gallatin Valley of Montana and settled between Deep Creek and Grayson, near Townsend, Montana, in 1910, where the family owned a ranch and raised dryland wheat. He attended the University of Missoula in the mid-1920s.

Clopton left for California in January 1927 for what was supposed to be a few months Instead, he was hired by Walt Disney in February and began working under animator Ub Iwerks as an in-betweener. His first cartoon was Alice's Three Bad Eggs. Clopton assisted Iwerks in drawing the first Mickey Mouse cartoon, Plane Crazy, in late April, 1927, but left the Disney studio in the middle of May to join Hugh Harman and Rudy Ising, who had been hired from Disney to make cartoons for Charles Mintz under contract with Universal Studios. Clopton directed six Oswald the Lucky Rabbit cartoons in 1928-1929.

Mintz lost distributorship of the Oswald cartoons in 1929. Harman and Ising then formed their own studio and signed a deal with Leon Schlesinger in 1930 to create the Looney Tunes series. Clopton took a job with Iwerks' studio until 1933, when Scheslinger refused to renew Harman and Ising's contract, started his own studio, and hired staff. Clopton was among the animators and his first film credit is on Buddy the Gob, released January 13, 1934. Clopton is credited on sixteen cartoons through 1936, when he left for the Walter Lantz studio. Clopton's name is on three cartoons released in 1937. His name appears for a final time on screen as an animator on Gulliver's Travels, released in 1939 by the Fleischer Studios.

Clopton returned to California and worked at Disney with his brother John before they were inducted into the U.S. Army in April, 1942. He was divorced in 1945 by his wife Sylvia Lamarr, stand-in for Hedy Lamarr and Joan Crawford. A wire service report made no mention of his animation career, instead stating he was a rancher. She testified at her divorce trial "He kept a loaded rifle around the house. He used to shoot holes in the ceiling. It made me very nervous".

He was living in Santa Monica, California, at the time of his mother's death in 1966 but re-settled back home in Townsend, Montana, where he died in 1987.

References

1906 births
1987 deaths
Animators from Montana
American animated film directors
People from Townsend, Montana
University of Montana alumni
Walt Disney Animation Studios people
Warner Bros. Cartoons people